The A514 road is a road in Derbyshire, England.

Route
It is a  stretch of single-carriageway road which runs south from Derby city centre .

It crosses the A5111 Derby ring road before a separated grade junction with the dual-carriageway A50 road. A little further south, the A5132 runs off to the west, just before the A514 crosses the River Trent over the narrow and historic Swarkestone Bridge.

The next significant junction is with the A511, where it enters a built up area. The road continues through Swadlincote, and terminates at its junction with the A444 road  just west of the town.

References 

Roads in England
Transport in Derby
Roads in Derbyshire